In organic chemistry, a dicarboxylic acid is an organic compound containing two carboxyl groups. In general, dicarboxylic acids show similar chemical behavior and reactivity to monocarboxylic acids.

Dicarboxylic acids are used in the preparation of copolymers such as polyamides and polyesters. The most widely used dicarboxylic acid in the industry is adipic acid, which is a precursor in the production of nylon. Other examples of dicarboxylic acids include aspartic acid and glutamic acid, two amino acids in the human body. The name can be abbreviated to diacid.

Linear and cyclic saturated dicarboxylic acids 
The PubChem links gives access to more information on the compounds, including other names, ids, toxicity and safety.

Acids from the two-carbon oxalic acid to the ten-member sebacic acid may be remembered using the mnemonic 'Oh My Son, Go And Pray Softly And Silently', and also 'Oh my! Such great Apple Pie, sweet as sugar!'.
{| class="wikitable"
|+
! n !! Common name !! Systematic IUPAC name !! Structure !! pKa1 !! pKa2 !! PubChem
|-
| 0 || Oxalic acid || ethanedioic acid ||  || 1.27 || 4.27 || 971
|-
| 1 || Malonic acid || propanedioic acid ||  || 2.85 || 5.05 || 867
|-
| 2 || Succinic acid || butanedioic acid ||  || 4.21 || 5.41 || 1110
|-
| 3 || Glutaric acid || pentanedioic acid ||  || 4.34 || 5.41 || 743
|-
| 4 || Adipic acid || hexanedioic acid ||  || 4.41 || 5.41 || 196
|-
| 5 || Pimelic acid || heptanedioic acid ||  || 4.50 || 5.43 || 385
|-
| 6 || Suberic acid || octanedioic acid ||  || 4.526 || 5.498 || 10457
|-
| 6 || 1,4-Cyclohexanedicarboxylic acid || same ||  ||  ||  ||14106
|-
| 7 || Azelaic acid || nonanedioic acid ||  || 4.550 || 5.498 || 2266
|-
| 8 || Sebacic acid || decanedioic acid ||  || 4.720 || 5.450 || 5192
|-
| 9 || || undecanedioic acid ||  || || || 15816
|-
| 10 || || dodecanedioic acid || 
| || || 12736
|-
| 13 || Brassylic acid || tridecanedioic acid ||  || || || 10458
|-
| 14 || Thapsic acid || hexadecanedioic acid ||  || || || 10459
|-
| 19 || Japanic acid || heneicosanedioic acid || || || || 9543668
|-
| 20 || Phellogenic acid || docosanedioic acid ||  || || || 244872
|-
| 28 || Equisetolic acid || triacontanedioic acid || || || || 5322010
|}

Occurrence 
 Adipic acid, despite its name (in Latin, adipis means fat), is not a normal constituent of natural lipids but is a product of oxidative rancidity. It was first obtained by oxidation of castor oil (ricinoleic acid) with nitric acid. It is now produced industrially by oxidation of cyclohexanol or cyclohexane, mainly for the production of Nylon 6-6. It has several other industrial uses in the production of adhesives, plasticizers, gelatinizing agents, hydraulic fluids, lubricants, emollients, polyurethane foams, leather tanning, urethane and also as an acidulant in foods.
 Pimelic acid (Greek , fat) was also first isolated from oxidized oil. Derivatives of pimelic acid are involved in the biosynthesis of lysine.
 Suberic acid was first produced by nitric acid oxidation of cork (Latin suber). This acid is also produced when castor oil is oxidised. Suberic acid is used in the manufacture of alkyd resins and in the synthesis of polyamides (nylon variants).
 Azelaic acid's name stems from the action of nitric acid (azote, nitrogen, or azotic, nitric) oxidation of oleic acid or elaidic acid. It was detected among products of rancid fats. Its origin explains for its presence in poorly preserved samples of linseed oil and in specimens of ointment removed from Egyptian tombs 5000 years old. Azelaic acid was prepared by oxidation of oleic acid with potassium permanganate, but now by oxidative cleavage of oleic acid with chromic acid or by ozonolysis.  Azelaic acid is used, as simple esters or branched-chain esters) in the manufacture of plasticizers (for vinyl chloride resins, rubber), lubricants and greases. Azelaic acid is now used in cosmetics (treatment of acne). It displays bacteriostatic and bactericidal properties against a variety of aerobic and anaerobic micro-organisms present on acne-bearing skin. . Azelaic acid was identified as a molecule that accumulated at elevated levels in some parts of plants and was shown to be able to enhance the resistance of plants to infections.
 Sebacic acid, named from sebum (tallow).  Thenard isolated this compound from distillation products of beef tallow in 1802. It is produced industrially by alkali fission of castor oil. Sebacic acid and its derivatives have a variety of industrial uses as plasticizers, lubricants, diffusion pump oils, cosmetics, candles, etc. It is also used in the synthesis of polyamide, as nylon, and of alkyd resins.  An isomer, isosebacic acid, has several applications in the manufacture of vinyl resin plasticizers, extrusion plastics, adhesives, ester lubricants, polyesters, polyurethane resins and synthetic rubber.
 Brassylic acid can be produced from erucic acid by ozonolysis, but also by microorganisms (Candida sp.) from tridecane. This diacid is produced on a small commercial scale in Japan for the manufacture of fragrances.
 Dodecanedioic acid is used in the production of nylon (nylon-6,12), polyamides, coatings, adhesives, greases, polyesters, dyestuffs, detergents, flame retardants, and fragrances. It is now produced by fermentation of long-chain alkanes with a specific strain of Candida tropicalis. Traumatic acid is its monounsaturated counterpart.
 Thapsic acid was isolated from the dried roots of the Mediterranean "deadly carrot", Thapsia garganica (Apiaceae).

Japan wax is a mixture containing triglycerides of C21, C22 and C23 dicarboxylic acids obtained from the sumac tree (Rhus sp.).

A large survey of the dicarboxylic acids present in Mediterranean nuts revealed unusual components. A total of 26 minor acids (from 2 in pecan to 8% in peanut) were determined: 8 species derived from succinic acid, likely in relation with photosynthesis, and 18 species with a chain from 5 to 22 carbon atoms. Higher weight acids (>C20) are found in suberin present at vegetal surfaces (outer bark, root epidermis).  C16 to C26 a, ω-dioic acids are considered as diagnostic for suberin. With C18:1 and C18:2, their content amount from 24 to 45% of whole suberin. They are present at low levels (< 5%) in plant cutin, except in Arabidopsis thaliana where their content can be higher than 50%.

It was shown that hyperthermophilic microorganisms specifically contained a large variety of dicarboxylic acids.
This is probably the most important difference between these microorganisms and other marine bacteria. Dioic fatty acids from C16 to C22 were found in an hyperthermophilic archaeon, Pyrococcus furiosus. Short and medium chain (up to 11 carbon atoms) dioic acids have been discovered in Cyanobacteria of the genus Aphanizomenon.

Dicarboxylic acids may be produced by ω-oxidation of fatty acids during their catabolism. It was discovered that these compounds appeared in urine after administration of tricaprin and triundecylin. Although the significance of their biosynthesis remains poorly understood, it was demonstrated that ω-oxidation occurs in rat liver but at a low rate, needs oxygen, NADPH and cytochrome P450. It was later shown that this reaction is more important in starving or diabetic animals where 15% of palmitic acid is subjected to ω-oxidation and then tob-oxidation, this generates malonyl-coA which is further used in saturated fatty acid synthesis.
The determination of the dicarboxylic acids generated by permanganate-periodate oxidation of monoenoic fatty acids was useful to study the position of the double bond in the carbon chain.

Branched-chain dicarboxylic acids 

Long-chain dicarboxylic acids containing vicinal dimethyl branching near the centre of the carbon chain have been discovered in the genus Butyrivibrio, bacteria which participate in the digestion of cellulose in the rumen. These fatty acids, named diabolic acids, have a chain length depending on the fatty acid used in the culture medium. The most abundant diabolic acid in Butyrivibrio had a 32-carbon chain length. Diabolic acids were also detected in the core lipids of the genus Thermotoga of the order Thermotogales, bacteria living in solfatara springs, deep-sea marine hydrothermal systems and high-temperature marine and continental oil fields. It was shown that about 10% of their lipid fraction were symmetrical C30 to C34 diabolic acids. The C30 (13,14-dimethyloctacosanedioic acid) and C32 (15,16-dimethyltriacontanedioic acid) diabolic acids have been described in Thermotoga maritima.

Some parent C29 to C32 diacids but with methyl groups on the carbons C-13 and C-16 have been isolated and characterized from the lipids of thermophilic anaerobic eubacterium Themanaerobacter ethanolicus. The most abundant diacid was the C30 a,ω-13,16-dimethyloctacosanedioic acid.

Biphytanic diacids are present in geological sediments and are considered as tracers of past anaerobic oxidation of methane. Several forms without or with one or two pentacyclic rings have been detected in Cenozoic seep limestones. These lipids may be unrecognized metabolites from Archaea.

Crocetin is the core compound of crocins (crocetin glycosides) which are the main red pigments of the stigmas of saffron (Crocus sativus) and the fruits of gardenia (Gardenia jasminoides). Crocetin is a 20-carbon chain dicarboxylic acid which is a diterpenenoid and can be considered as a carotenoid. It was the first plant carotenoid to be recognized as early as 1818 while the history of saffron cultivation reaches back more than 3,000 years.  The major active ingredient of saffron is the yellow pigment crocin 2 (three other derivatives with different glycosylations are known) containing a gentiobiose (disaccharide) group at each end of the molecule. A simple and specific HPLC-UV method has been developed to quantify the five major biologically active ingredients of saffron, namely the four crocins and crocetin.

Unsaturated dicarboxylic acids 

{| class="wikitable"
|+
|-
! Type !! Common name !! IUPAC name !! Isomer !! Structural formula !! PubChem
|-
| rowspan="7" | Monounsaturated || Maleic acid || (Z)-Butenedioic acid || cis ||  || 444266
|-
| Fumaric acid || (E)-Butenedioic acid   || trans ||  || 444972
|-
| Acetylenedicarboxylic acid || But-2-ynedioic acid   || not applicable ||  || 371
|-
| rowspan="2" | Glutaconic acid || (Z)-Pent-2-enedioic acid || cis ||  || 5370328
|-
|  (E)-Pent-2-enedioic acid || trans ||  || 5280498
|-
| || 2-Decenedioic acid || trans ||  || 6442613
|-
| Traumatic acid  || Dodec-2-enedioic acid || trans ||  || 5283028
|-
| rowspan="4" | Diunsaturated || rowspan=3 | Muconic acid || (2E,4E)-Hexa-2,4-dienedioic acid || trans,trans
|  || 5356793
|-
|  (2Z,4E)-Hexa-2,4-dienedioic acid || cis,trans ||  || 280518
|-
|  (2Z,4Z)-Hexa-2,4-dienedioic acid || cis,cis ||  || 5280518
|-
| Glutinic acid(Allene-1,3-dicarboxylic acid) || (RS)-Penta-2,3-dienedioic acid || || HO2CCH=C=CHCO2H || 5242834
|-
| rowspan="3" | Branched || Citraconic acid || (2Z)-2-Methylbut-2-enedioic acid || cis ||  || 643798
|-
| Mesaconic acid || (2E)-2-Methyl-2-butenedioic acid || trans ||  || 638129
|-
|  Itaconic acid || 2-Methylidenebutanedioic acid || – ||  || 811
|}
Traumatic acid, was among the first biologically active molecules isolated from plant tissues. This dicarboxylic acid was shown to be a potent wound healing agent in plant that stimulates cell division near a wound site,
it derives from 18:2 or 18:3 fatty acid hydroperoxides after conversion into oxo- fatty acids.

trans,trans-Muconic acid is a metabolite of benzene in humans.  The determination of its concentration in urine is therefore used as a biomarker of occupational or environmental exposure to benzene.

Glutinic acid, a substituted allene, was isolated from Alnus glutinosa (Betulaceae).

While polyunsaturated fatty acids are unusual in plant cuticles, a diunsaturated dicarboxylic acid has been reported as a component of the surface waxes or polyesters of some plant species. Thus, octadeca-c6,c9-diene-1,18-dioate, a derivative of linoleic acid, is present in Arabidopsis and Brassica napus cuticle.

Alkylitaconates 

Several dicarboxylic acids having an alkyl side chain and an itaconate core have been isolated from lichens and fungi, itaconic acid (methylenesuccinic acid) being a metabolite produced by filamentous fungi. Among these compounds, several analogues, called chaetomellic acids with different chain lengths and degrees of unsaturation have been isolated from various species of the lichen Chaetomella. These molecules were shown to be valuable as basis for the development of anticancer drugs due to their strong farnesyltransferase inhibitory effects.

A series of alkyl- and alkenyl-itaconates, known as ceriporic acids (Pub Chem 52921868), were found in cultures of a selective lignin-degrading fungus (white rot fungus), Ceriporiopsis subvermispora. The absolute configuration of ceriporic acids, their stereoselective biosynthetic pathway and the diversity of their metabolites have been discussed in detail.

Substituted dicarboxylic acids 
{| class="wikitable"
|+
|-
! Common name !! IUPAC name !! Structural formula !! PubChem
|-
| Tartronic acid || 2-Hydroxypropanedioic acid ||  || 45
|-
| Mesoxalic acid || Oxopropanedioic acid ||  || 10132
|-
| Malic acid || Hydroxybutanedioic acid ||  || 525
|-
| Tartaric acid || 2,3-Dihydroxybutanedioic acid ||  || 875
|-
| Oxaloacetic acid || Oxobutanedioic acid ||  || 970
|-
| Aspartic acid || 2-Aminobutanedioic acid ||  || 5960
|-
| dioxosuccinic acid || dioxobutanedioic acid ||  || 82062
|-
| α-hydroxyGlutaric acid || 2-hydroxypentanedioic acid ||  || 43
|-
| Arabinaric acid || 2,3,4-Trihydroxypentanedioic acid || || 109475
|-
| Acetonedicarboxylic acid || 3-Oxopentanedioic acid ||  || 68328
|-
| α-Ketoglutaric acid || 2-Oxopentanedioic acid ||  || 51
|-
| Glutamic acid || 2-Aminopentanedioic acid ||  || 611
|-
| Diaminopimelic acid || (2R,6S)-2,6-Diaminoheptanedioic acid ||  || 865
|-
| Saccharic acid || (2S,3S,4S,5R)-2,3,4,5-Tetrahydroxyhexanedioic acid ||  || 33037
|}

Aromatic dicarboxylic acids 
{| class="wikitable"
|+
! Common names !! IUPAC name !! Structure || PubChem
|-
| Phthalic acido-phthalic acid || Benzene-1,2-dicarboxylic acid ||  || 1017
|-
| Isophthalic acidm-phthalic acid || Benzene-1,3-dicarboxylic acid ||  || 8496
|-
| Terephthalic acidp-phthalic acid || Benzene-1,4-dicarboxylic acid ||  || 7489
|-
| Diphenic acidBiphenyl-2,2′-dicarboxylic acid || 2-(2-Carboxyphenyl)benzoic acid ||  || 10210
|-
| 2,6-Naphthalenedicarboxylic acid || 2,6-Naphthalenedicarboxylic acid ||  || 14357
|}
Terephthalic acid is a commodity chemical used in the manufacture of the polyester known by brand names such as PET, Terylene, Dacron and Lavsan.

Properties 
Dicarboxylic acids are crystalline solids. Solubility in water and melting point of the α,ω- compounds progress in a series as the carbon chains become longer with alternating between odd and even numbers of carbon atoms, so that for even numbers of carbon atoms the melting point is higher than for the next in the series with an odd number. These compounds are weak dibasic acids with pKa tending towards values of ca. 4.5 and 5.5 as the separation between the two carboxylate groups increases. Thus, in an aqueous solution at pH about 7, typical of biological systems, the Henderson–Hasselbalch equation indicates they exist predominantly as dicarboxylate anions.

The dicarboxylic acids, especially the small and linear ones, can be used as crosslinking reagents. Dicarboxylic acids where the carboxylic groups are separated by none or one carbon atom decompose when they are heated to give off carbon dioxide and leave behind a monocarboxylic acid.

Blanc's Rule says that heating a barium salt of a dicarboxylic acid, or dehydrating it with acetic anhydride will yield a cyclic acid anhydride if the carbon atoms bearing acid groups are in position 1 and (4 or 5). So succinic acid will yield succinic anhydride.  For acids with carboxylic groups at position 1 and 6 this dehydration causes loss of carbon dioxide and water to form a cyclic ketone, for example, adipic acid will form cyclopentanone.

Derivatives 
As for monofunctional carboxylic acids, derivatives of the same types exist.  However, there is the added complication that either one or two of the carboxylic groups could be altered.  If only one is changed then the derivative is termed "acid", and if both ends are altered it is called "normal".  These derivatives include salts, chlorides, esters, amides, and anhydrides.  In the case of anhydrides or amides, two of the carboxyl groups can come together to form a cyclic compound, for example succinimide.

See also 
 Tricarboxylic acid

References

External links 
 Lipidomics gateway Structure Database Dicarboxylic acids